The Office of the National Cyber Director is an agency in the United States Government statutorily responsible for advising the President of the United States on matters related to cybersecurity. It was established in 2021.

History
The position of National Cyber Director was established under the National Defense Authorization Act for Fiscal Year 2021 on the recommendation of the Cyberspace Solarium Commission, a congressionally-authorized panel convened in 2019 and chaired by United States Senator Angus King and Representative Mike Gallagher. Situated within the Executive Office of the President of the United States, it is statutorily charged with "programs and policies intended to improve the cybersecurity posture of the United States, ... diplomatic and other efforts to develop norms and international consensus around responsible state behavior in cyberspace" and other matters related to cybersecurity.

Authorizing legislation for the office permitted the hiring of up to 75 staff, however, failed to appropriate any funds to do so. By August 2021, the White House was able to identify $250,000 in contingency funding to hire a few personnel to support inaugural director Chris Inglis.

Current Staff
 National Cyber Director: Kemba Walden (acting Director)
 Chief of Staff: John Costello
 Principal Deputy National Cyber Director: Kemba Eneas Walden
 Deputy National Cyber Director for Federal Cyber Security: Chris DeRusha
 Deputy National Cyber Director for National Cyber Security: Neal Higgins
 Deputy National Cyber Director for Strategy and Budget: Rob Knake
 Deputy National Cyber Director for Technology and Ecosystem Security: Camille Stewart Gloster 
 Senior Policy Advisor: Rex Booth

List of National Cyber Directors

See also
 Cybersecurity and Infrastructure Security Agency

References

Executive Office of the President of the United States